Delavari-ye Gorgian (also Romanized as Delāvarī-ye Gorgīān; also known as Delāvarī) is a village in Ludab Rural District, Ludab District, Boyer-Ahmad County, Kohgiluyeh and Boyer-Ahmad Province, Iran. At the 2006 census, its population was 33, in 6 families.

References 

Populated places in Boyer-Ahmad County